Shahbaz ({شهباز}}; also known as Shahbaz) is a City in Qarah Kahriz Rural District, Qarah Kahriz District, Shazand County, Markazi Province, Iran. At the 2006 census, its population was 2,681, in 691 families.

References 

Populated places in Shazand County